Hate You may refer to:

 "Hate You" (2NE1 song), 2011
 "Hate You" (Daredevils song), 1996
 "Hate You" (Ladies' Code song), 2013
 "Hate You", a song by Ingrid Michaelson from the album Stranger Songs
 "H.A.T.E.U.", a song by Mariah Carey from Memoirs of an Imperfect Angel

See also
 I Hate You (disambiguation)